Sīrīn bint Shamʿūn (Arabic: سيرين بنت شمعون) was an Egyptian Coptic Christian concubine, sent with her sister Maria al-Qibtiyya as gifts to the Islamic prophet Muhammad from the Egyptian official Muqawqis in 628.

According to the historian Ibn Saad, both sisters converted to Islam while on their way to Arabia with the encouragement of Hatib ibn Abi Balta'ah, who had been sent as a messenger to a governor of Egypt.

Sirin was married to the poet Hassan ibn Thabit, and bore a son, Abdurahman ibn Hassan.

See also
List of non-Arab Sahaba
Sunni view of the Sahaba

Notes

References
 Tabari (1997). Vol. 8 of the Tarikh al-Rusul wa al-Muluk. State University of New York Press.

7th-century births
7th-century deaths
Egyptian Copts
Women companions of the Prophet
Egyptian slaves